Jean Marishall (Jane Marshall) (fl. 1765–1788) was a Scottish novelist and dramatist. She was employed by the publisher John Newbery as a writer for the young. As a novelist she was influenced by Samuel Richardson.

Works
Marishall published:

The History of Miss Clarinda Cathcart and Miss Fanny Kenton, October 1765. a sentimental epistolary novel. A second edition appeared in 1760, and a third in 1767. 
The History of Alicia Montagu, by the Author of Clarinda Cathcart, 1767, 2 vols.
Sir Harry Gaylove, or Comedy in Embryo, 1772, printed in Edinburgh, with a prologue by Thomas Blacklock, an epilogue by Hugh Downman, and a preface by herself.
A Series of Letters for the Improvement of Youth, 1788.

Notes

Attribution
 

Year of birth missing
Year of death missing
18th-century Scottish writers
18th-century British women writers
18th-century British writers
18th-century Scottish dramatists and playwrights
Scottish novelists
Scottish women dramatists and playwrights
Scottish women novelists